Lists of animated feature films released in the 1980s organized by year of release:
 List of animated feature films of 1980
 List of animated feature films of 1981
 List of animated feature films of 1982
 List of animated feature films of 1983
 List of animated feature films of 1984
 List of animated feature films of 1985
 List of animated feature films of 1986
 List of animated feature films of 1987
 List of animated feature films of 1988
 List of animated feature films of 1989

See also
 List of highest-grossing animated films of the 1980s

1980s
Animated